Challenge Airlines (IATA code: X7; ICAO code: CHG) established as ACE Air Cargo Europe and in 2018 rebranded as ACE Belgium Freighteres, is a Belgian cargo airline based in Liege Airport. The carrier operates air cargo services throughout Europe, America, Asia, Middle East and Africa. Challenge Airlines launched service operations in mid-2019.

History
The company originally dates back to 1976, when its predecessor, CAL Cargo Airlines, began flying out of Ben Gurion Airport in Tel Aviv, Israel, originally flying agricultural products to Europe. As it expanded, the company operated its main hub in Liege, Belgium.

Eshel Heffetz, a former air force pilot, economist and graduate of Tel Aviv University, founded the modern Challenge Airlines in 2017. Challenge Airlines received its AOC in April 2019. In July 2019, the company launched services to the United States, and in September 2020 it began flying to China.

CAL Cargo Airlines and Challenge Airlines were integrated into the Challenge Group in 2020. In 2022, CAL Cargo Airlines rebranded to Challenge Airlines IL.

The company has a subsidiary based in Malta branded as Challenge Airlines MT, which received its Air Operator's Certificate in November of 2022. The airline flew its first flight later that month. The subsidiary is likely to fly a mix of perishable, pharma, and sea/air connections at first and eventually expand to fly the group's specialties of horses, cars, engines, and more in the long-term.

The airline is especially focusing on expanding its presence in the sea-to-air business model with a focus on the United Arab Emirates' market. It also serves as a contractor for the Israeli Ministries of Foreign Affairs, Health, and Defense.

Fleet 
As of December 2022, the airline operates three Boeing 747s and two Boeing 767s across all airlines in its group with firm plans to add an additional two 767s to the Israeli fleet. It also has plans to add a Boeing 777 to its fleet.

1 – Boeing 747-400BCF (OO-ACE)

1 – Boeing 747-400ERF (OO-ACF)

1 – Boeing 747-400F (OE-LRG)

2 – Boeing 767-300ER (9H-CAD) (operating for Challenge Airlines MT)

Destinations 
From its base in Liege Airport, Challenge Airlines fly cargo operations to the following destinations: Houston, Atlanta, New York, Oslo, Larnaca, Tel Aviv, Wuhan via Astana, and Dubai (SHJ). Challenge Airlines MT flies from Malta to Tel Aviv, Sharjah, New York, and Indian Sub-Continent.

References 

			 

Airlines of Belgium
Airlines established in 2017
Cargo airlines of Belgium
Companies based in Liège Province
2017 establishments in Belgium